Peyrajeh Rural District is a rural district (dehestan) in the Central District of Neka County, Mazandaran Province, Iran. At the 2006 census, its population was 11,805, in 2,994 families. The rural district has 22 villages.

References 

Rural Districts of Mazandaran Province
Neka County